Buel is a ghost town in Center Township, Mitchell County, Kansas, United States.

History
Buel was issued a post office in 1883. The post office was discontinued in 1903.

References

Former populated places in Mitchell County, Kansas
Former populated places in Kansas